Group F of the 1994 FIFA World Cup was one of six groups of four teams competing at the 1994 World Cup in the United States. The first match was played June 19, 1994 and the final games took place simultaneously on June 29, 1994.

The group consisted of Belgium, Morocco, Netherlands and Saudi Arabia. Netherlands won the group, Saudi Arabia finished second and Belgium qualified as one of the best third-placed teams.

Standings

Matches
All times local (EDT/UTC–4, CDT/UTC–5, PDT/UTC–7)

Belgium vs Morocco

Netherlands vs Saudi Arabia

Belgium vs Netherlands

Saudi Arabia vs Morocco

Belgium vs Saudi Arabia

Morocco vs Netherlands

References

Group F
Group
Group F
Saudi Arabia at the 1994 FIFA World Cup
Belgium at the 1994 FIFA World Cup